Fairfield County Courthouse may refer to:

 Fairfield County Courthouse (Bridgeport, Connecticut), listed on the NRHP in Fairfield County, Connecticut
 Fairfield County Courthouse (Danbury, Connecticut)
 Fairfield County Courthouse (Ohio)